Bülbül is a village in the Yeşilli District of Mardin Province in Turkey. The village is populated by Assyrians and had a population of 67 in 2021.

The Mor Hananyo Monastery is located close to the village.

References 

Villages in Yeşilli District
Assyrian communities in Turkey